Arthur Stuart Webb (6 August 1868 – 3 December 1952) was an English first-class cricketer. Webb was a right-handed batsman who bowled right-arm medium pace.

Webb made his first-class debut for Hampshire County Cricket Club in the 1895 County Championship against Essex. Webb represented Hampshire in 149 first-class matches from 1895 to 1904, with his final appearance for the county coming in 1904 against Somerset at Dean Park Cricket Ground, Bournemouth.

In his 149 matches for the county, Webb scored 5,475 runs at a batting average of 21.54, with 28 half centuries, two centuries and a high score of 161* against Surrey in his benefit match of 1904; the match itself was badly hit by rain, with Webb's share of the takings only amounting to £150. With the ball Webb took 22 wickets at a bowling average of 46.50, with best figures of 2/18. In the field Webb took 83 catches for Hampshire.

In addition to playing first-class matches for Hampshire, Webb also made a single first-class appearance for the Players of the South against the Gentlemen of England in 1904. In 1912 Holmes played his final first-class match for South Wales against the touring Australians.

Also in 1912, Webb played a single Minor Counties Championship match for Glamorgan against the Surrey Second XI.

Following his move to Wales, Webb  was a professional and groundsman at Briton Ferry Steelworks and later coached cricket at Christ College, Brecon. Webb died at Briton Ferry, Glamorgan on 3 December 1952.

Family
Webb's brother George made a single first-class appearance for Kent against Sussex in 1880.

External links
Arthur Webb at Cricinfo
Arthur Webb at CricketArchive
Matches and detailed statistics for Arthur Webb

1868 births
1952 deaths
People from Bridge, Kent
English cricketers
Hampshire cricketers
Glamorgan cricketers
English cricket coaches
South Wales cricketers
Players of the South cricketers